was a town located in Minamitakaki District, Nagasaki Prefecture, Japan.

As of 2003, the town had an estimated population of 6,450 and a density of 646.29 persons per km². The total area was 9.98 km².

On March 31, 2006, Kuchinotsu, along with the towns of Arie, Fukae, Futsu, Kazusa, Kitaarima, Minamiarima and Nishiarie (all from Minamitakaki District), was merged to create the city of Minamishimabara.

History
An Imperial decree in July 1899 established Kuchinotsu as an open port for trading with the United States and the United Kingdom.

Climate

References

External links
 Minamishimabara official website 

Dissolved municipalities of Nagasaki Prefecture